is a Japanese horror anime and manga series created by Go Nagai. It is a sequel/remake of Dororon Enma-kun. The manga version of Demon Prince Enma would get a sequel called Satanikus Enma Kerberos by Eiji Karasuyama in 2007.

Plot
Four grown demons (Enma, Yukihime, Kapaeru, and Grandpa Chapeauji) are part of a Yokai-Patrol searching for demons that have escaped from Hell into the human world. They form the group known as the Enma Detective Agency as a cover for their activities.

Main characters

He has returned to the mortal world in order to get rid of the demons that have escaped from the underworld. He is a fire-based demon and he's the nephew of Enma-Daio. His name in Kanji means flame demon and it's read the same way as Enma, the ruler of the underworld.

She is an ice-based demon who acts as the partner of Enma in their endeavour to return the escaped demons to the underworld. In the OVA, while she has a cold personality and certain disdain for Enma on the surface, she actually is in love with him but knows and regrets that they cannot be together since they are opposing forces (Ice/Flame). This situation plays an important part when she gets possessed by a demon. Her name means snow devil princess and its probably related to the Japanese folklore myth of Yuki-onna.

He is a kappa who has been living in the mortal realm for many years. He is in charge of gathering information regarding the location of the hunted demons. In the OVA, he has fooled persons into believing that his appearance is a disguise. He has a secret contact (whom he holds dear) that helps him get most of the clues of the cases. Both of them die at the hands of the demon that possesses Yukihime. In the manga, he tricks and betrays Enma and Yukihime.

An old demon with the form of a hat, he possesses great knowledge in all the matters related to the underworld and demons. In the OVA, he is often sleeping because of his old age and is mostly in the head of Enma. While he rarely takes action, he advises Enma of the best course of action as well as alerting him of the presence of demons. In the manga, he is younger, can change of shape and appearance, has a more aggressive personality and a more active role.

A Vampire type Rot-Pus Suck Demon.

Media

OVA

Manga

Demon Prince Enma

Satanikus Enma Kerberos
 or Satanikus ENMA Κέρβερος is a direct sequel to the Demon Prince Enma, with no relation to the OVA. Its serialization started on June 26, 2007 in the number of August 2007 of Kodansha's Magazine Z. While Demon Prince Emma is an adult horror-action manga, Satanikus ENMA Kerberos takes a less serious tone and becomes slightly more lighthearted. The focus of the series is the quest to revive Enma.

Reception
Helen McCarthy in 500 Essential Anime Movies says the violence is "extreme", but "it's stylishly designed and animated". She praises the soundtrack and humor, which is "well integrated in the characters".

References

External links
 Demon Prince Emma  Official site (OVA).
 
 Satanikus ENMA Kerberos  at Kodansha Comics Plus

2006 anime OVAs
2006 manga
2007 manga
Bandai Entertainment anime titles
Brain's Base
Go Nagai
Horror anime and manga
Seinen manga
Yōkai in anime and manga